Rasa Juknevičienė (born 26 January 1958) is a Lithuanian politician and paediatrician  who has been serving as a Member of the European Parliament since 2019. She served as Minister of Defense of Lithuania since 2008 to 2012. She is a member of center right Homeland Union.

Early life and education
Juknevičienė is a graduate of the Lithuanian University of Health Sciences (LSMU) and worked as a doctor until 1992.

Political career

Career in national politics
With interruptions, Juknevičienė was a member of the Lithuanian Parliament (Seimas) from 1996 until 2019. During her time in parliament, she held positions as Deputy Chair of the Committee on National Security and Defense; and Head of the Seimas Delegation to the NATO Parliamentary Assembly.

Juknevičienė has been member of the Lithuanian delegation to the NATO Parliamentary Assembly since 1999. She was rapporteur of the Sub-Committee on NATO Partnerships from 2007 to 2008. She served as the Assembly's Vice-President from 2016 until 2018, when she became President.

Member of the European Parliament, 2019–present
Since the 2019 European Parliament election, Juknevičienė has been serving on the Parliament's Committee on Development. In 2021, she became Vice-Chair of the Group of the European People's Party in the European Parliament.

In addition to her committee assignments, Juknevičienė is part of the European Parliament Intergroup on Artificial Intelligence and Digital and the MEPs Against Cancer group.

Other activities
 European Council on Foreign Relations (ECFR), Member
 Center for European Policy Analysis (CEPA), Member of the Advisory Council (since 2014)
 Facebook.

References

Mąstanti globaliai, veikianti konkrečiai. Ona VOVERIENĖ. Retrieved 2009-10-11

1958 births
Living people
Female defence ministers
Women members of the Seimas
Ministers of Defence of Lithuania
Women government ministers of Lithuania
21st-century Lithuanian politicians
21st-century Lithuanian women politicians
MEPs for Lithuania 2019–2024
Women MEPs for Lithuania
Members of the Seimas